Although Hinduism and Buddhism are no longer the major religions of Indonesia, Sanskrit, the language vehicle for these religions, is still held in high esteem, and its status is comparable with that of Latin in English and other Western European languages. Sanskrit is also the main source for neologisms; these are usually formed from Sanskrit roots. For example, the name of Jayapura city (former Hollandia) and Jayawijaya Mountains (former Orange Range) in the Indonesian province of Papua were coined in the 1960s; both are Sanskrit origin name to replace its Dutch colonial names. Some Indonesian contemporary medals of honor and awards, such as Bintang Mahaputra medal, Kalpataru award and Adipura award, are also Sanskrit derived names.

The loanwords from Sanskrit cover many aspects of religion, art and everyday life. The Sanskrit influence came from contacts with India long ago before the 1st century. The words are either directly borrowed from India or through the intermediary of the Old Javanese language. In the classical language of Java, Old Javanese, the number of Sanskrit loanwords is far greater. The Old Javanese — English dictionary by Prof. P.J. Zoetmulder, S.J. (1982) contains no fewer than 25,500 entries. Almost half are Sanskrit loanwords. Sanskrit loanwords, unlike those from other languages, have entered the basic vocabulary of Indonesian to such an extent that, for many, they are no longer perceived to be foreign.

There are some rules of forming loans from Sanskrit: s, ṣ, and ś merge to single s; v changes to w, and the original aspiration, retroflexion, and vowel length is lost (most similar to some earliest stages of Insular Indic, including the ancestor of Sinhala, Elu).

Loanwords

References

Indonesia culture-related lists
Indonesian words and phrases
Indic